Violet "Lola" Ingeborg Else Kramarsky (née Popper; 1896 – February 28, 1991) was president of Hadassah Women's Zionist Organization of America from 1960 to 1964. She died in 1991. She was married to Siegfried Kramarsky from 1921 until his death in 1961.

References

External links
Guide to the Hadassah Archives on Long-term Deposit at the American Jewish Historical Society

1896 births
1991 deaths
American Zionists
American people of German-Jewish descent
Hadassah Women's Zionist Organization of America members
20th-century American Jews
German emigrants to the United States